Bragernes is one of the central areas of the city of Drammen in Viken, Norway.

Location
Bragernes is located on the northern side of the Drammen River (Drammenselva) and contains the famous town square Bragernes square (Bragernes Torg), the town hall, the Drammen Theatre (Drammens Teater), Drammen park, and most of the shopping and nightlife in Drammen. Also part of Bragernes are several surrounding residential areas, including Øren, Underlia, Hotvet, Landfalløya, Toppenhaug, Strøtvet and Brakerøya. 

Immediately north of Bragernes is the Bragernes Hill (Bragernesåsen), a large recreational woodland area with an extensive network of trails and paths, some with magnificent views of central Drammen.

Bragernes Church
The main church in Bragernes dates from 1871. Bragernes Church (Bragernes kirke) was erected in neo-Gothic style and located in the heights towards the hill. Its well-known altarpiece with the Resurrection by Adolph Tidemand has been copied in many other churches within Norway. The beautiful carillon has 35 bells.

Drammen Theater
Drammen Theater (Drammens Teater) in Drammen was built in 1869  and was designed by Swedish architect Emil Victor Langlet (1824-1898). The theater was designed by the same model as Parisian theaters as the Châtelet, and performed in a complex  Renaissance style with symmetrical facades and round arched windows. The theater was the first modern theater house  in the country and was regarded as one of the most beautiful in the Nordic countries.

In December 1993, Drammen Theater suffered the total destruction of a fire. The new theater was rebuilt on the model of the original house. It was finished during February 1997 under the direction of architect  Jan Øyvind Berntzen.

Bragernes Square
Bragernes Square (Bragernes Torg) is the main square in Drammen.  Bragernes Torg is Norway's largest square and one of the largest within Scandinavia.  Bragernes Torg maintains a number of urban functions and provides the setting for numerous events. It is both a public place and trade market.

Its history starts in 1866, when most of Bragernes was affected by a great fire that devastated 388 buildings. The square is lined by several old, interesting buildings that were built after the fire of 1866.

References

External links
Bragernes Hill

Drammen